The Finland State Forest is a state forest located near the unincorporated community of Finland in Lake and Cook counties, Minnesota. The federal United States Forest Service manages roughly a quarter of the total forest acreage, as its boundary overlaps in part with that of Superior National Forest. The remainder is split between Cook and Lake County agencies, and private landowners.

Outdoor recreation opportunities in the forest include camping and hiking throughout the forest, canoeing, kayaking, and boating on the numerous lakes. Cold-water streams and lakes make trout fishing a popular activity. A large amount of the camping traffic is due to the forest's location  from the popular Tettegouche State Park. Additionally, trails located throughout the forest accommodate a wide variety of activities. These include  designated for mountain biking,  for Class I All-terrain vehicle (ATV) use,  for off-highway motorcycling, the  Moose Walk Snowmobile Trail, as well as cross-country skiing.

See also
List of Minnesota state forests
Tettegouche State Park

References

External links
Finland State Forest - Minnesota Department of Natural Resources (DNR)

Minnesota state forests
Protected areas of Lake County, Minnesota
Protected areas of Cook County, Minnesota
Protected areas established in 1933